Alter Isaac Levin (4 January 1883 – 4 October 1933), also known by the pen name Asaph ha-Levi, was a Hebrew-language writer and poet. 

Born in Minsk, he immigrated to Ottoman Jerusalem (later Mandatory Palestine) in 1891, studying there at the Etz Chaim Yeshiva. During World War I he conducted espionage for the British. He committed suicide in 1933.

Publications

References

1883 births
1933 deaths
19th-century Jews from the Russian Empire
Ashkenazi Jews in Ottoman Palestine
Emigrants from the Russian Empire to the Ottoman Empire
Hebrew-language poets
Jewish poets
Ashkenazi Jews in Mandatory Palestine
Suicides by hanging in Mandatory Palestine